The 2nd arrondissement of Paris (IIe arrondissement) is one of the 20 arrondissements of the capital city of France. In spoken French, this arrondissement is colloquially referred to as deuxième (second/the second). It is governed locally together with the 1st, 3rd and 4th arrondissement, with which it forms the 1st sector of Paris.

Also known as Bourse, this arrondissement is located on the right bank of the River Seine. The 2nd arrondissement, together with the adjacent 8th and 9th arrondissements, hosts an important business district, centred on the Paris Opéra, which houses the city's most dense concentration of business activities. The arrondissement contains the former Paris Bourse (stock exchange) and several banking headquarters, as well as a textile district, known as the Sentier, and the Opéra-Comique's theatre, the Salle Favart. The 2nd arrondissement is the home of Grand Rex, the largest movie theater in Paris.

The 2nd arrondissement is also the home of most of Paris's surviving 19th-century glazed commercial arcades. At the beginning of the 19th century, most of the streets of Paris were dark, muddy, and lacked sidewalks. A few entrepreneurs copied the success of the Passage des Panoramas and its well-lit, dry, and paved pedestrian passageways. By the middle of the 19th century, there were about two dozen of these commercial malls, but most of them disappeared as the Paris authorities paved the main streets and added sidewalks, as well as gas street lighting. The commercial survivors are – in addition to the Passage des Panoramas – the Galerie Vivienne, the Passage Choiseul, the Galerie Colbert, the Passage des Princes, the Passage du Grand Cerf, the Passage du Caire, the Passage Lemoine, the Passage Jouffroy, the Passage Basfour, the Passage du Bourg-L'abbé, and the Passage du Ponceau.

Geography
The 2nd arrondissement is Paris's smallest arrondissement, with a land area of just 0.992 km2, or 99.2 hectares (0.383 sq. miles, or 245 acres).

Demographics
The 2nd arrondissement reached its peak of settlement in the years before 1861, although it has only existed in its current shape since the re-organization of Paris in 1860. As of the last census (in 1999), the population was 19,585, while the number of jobs provided there was 61,672 – this despite a land area of only 0.992 km2, making it the arrondissement with the densest concentration of commercial activity in the capital, with an average of 62,695 jobs per km2.

Historical population
¹

Immigration

Economy
The French newspaper L'Obs has its head office in the arrondissement. Bourbon has its head office in the arrondissement. All Nippon Airways has its Paris Office in the  arrondissement. China Airlines also has its France office in the arrondissement.

Aigle Azur's registered office is in the arrondissement.

Education

In terms of state-operated schools, the second arrondissement has three nursery schools (écoles maternelles), five primary schools (écoles élémentaires),  and one high school (collège).

The nursery schools are École Maternelle Dussoubs, École Maternelle Saint Denis, and École Maternelle Vivienne. The primary schools are École Élémentaire Beauregard, École Élémentaire Dussoubs, École Élémentaire Etienne Marcel, École Élémentaire Jussienne, and École Élémentaire Louvois. Collège César Franck is the sole state-operated high school in the arrondissement.

École Élémentaire Privée Saint-Sauveur is the sole private primary school institution in the second arrondissement. Private secondary school institutions include École du 2nd Degré Général Privée Rene Reaumur, École Générale et Technologique Privée Lafayette, École du 2nd degré professionnel privée CTRE PRI ENS SOINS ESTHETIQUES, École du 2nd degré professionnel privée EC INTERNATIONALE DE COIFFURE, École du 2nd degré professionnel privée ECOLE DE BIJOUTERIE-JOAILLERIE, and École technologique privée ITECOM INST TECHN COMMUNIC.

Map

Cityscape

Places of interest in the arrondissement

 Bibliothèque nationale de France historical building (site Richelieu) (Monument historique)
 Galerie Colbert
 Opéra-Comique
 Paris stock exchange (Palais Brongniart, former headquarters)
 Passage des Panoramas
 Théâtre des Bouffes Parisiens
 Théâtre des Variétés
 Théâtre-Musée des Capucines, a perfume museum
 Tour Jean sans Peur, the last vestige of the Hôtel de Bourgogne

Former buildings in the arrondissement
 Salle Feydeau
 Salle de la Bourse
 Théâtre de l'Hôtel de Bourgogne

Main streets and squares

 Rue de la Banque
 Place de la Bourse
 Boulevard de Bonne-Nouvelle
 Boulevard des Capucines
 Rue des Capucines
 Rue de Cléry
 Rue Étienne-Marcel
 Rue du Faubourg-Montmartre
 Boulevard des Italiens
 Rue du Louvre
 Rue Monsigny
 Boulevard Montmartre
 Rue Montmartre
 Rue Montorgueil
 Rue Notre-Dame des Victoires
 Avenue de l'Opéra (partial)
 Rue de la Paix
 Rue des Petits-Champs
 Boulevard Poissonnière
 Rue du Quatre-Septembre
 Rue Réaumur
 Rue de Richelieu (partial)
 Boulevard Saint-Denis
 Rue Saint-Denis
 Rue Sainte-Anne
 Rue Saint-Sauveur
 Boulevard Sébastopol
 Rue de Turbigo
 Place des Victoires (partial)

References

 Le Guide du routard 2006: Paris.
 54 Promenades en Famille. A Paris et en Île-de-France.

External links